Marijana Goranović (born 3 January 1989) is a Montenegrin Paralympic shot putter. She competed for Montenegro at the 2012 Summer Paralympics, the only athlete for her country.

References

Athletes (track and field) at the 2012 Summer Paralympics
Athletes (track and field) at the 2020 Summer Paralympics
Paralympic athletes of Montenegro
1989 births
Living people
Female shot putters
Montenegrin shot putters
Montenegrin female athletes